Pendau (Ndaoe, Ndau), or Umalasa, is a Celebic language of Sulawesi in Indonesia spoken by the approximately 4000 Pendau people who live in Central Sulawesi. Classified as an endangered language, Pendau is primarily spoken inside of Pendau villages whereas Indonesian is used to speak with neighboring communities and is the language of children's education and outside officials. The highest concentration of speakers is in and around Kecamatan Balaesang. There are no known dialects within the Pendau region, although speakers from the mainland can identify whether a speaker is from the Balaesang peninsula through their 'rhythm' or intonation pattern. In recent years, some Pendau leaders have worked with local government to preserve their language alongside Indonesian.

History 
While the history of the Pendau has only been recently documented, a history has been pulled together through folklore and oral traditional, historical documents kept by European explorers, Pendau language developments, and the present situation of the Pendau. In contrast to neighboring groups, older Pendau men hold that the Pendau have never had a king and view themselves as having no class distinctions, although hierarchical roles did exist in decision-making and conflict resolution. The earliest document about the Pendau comes from 1795, when an American crew led by Captain David Woodward was found stranded off the west coast of Sulawesi. Between 1925-1935, Dutch-trained Indonesian evangelists began to arrive, and many of the Pendau today are registered as Christians by the government and practice Christianity (although many features of animism are still practiced). During World War II, the Japanese occupied Indonesia. Some Pendau still recite Japanese phrases and songs, although there are mixed opinions about the occupation with the occupation described as a difficult time by many who remember it. In recent history, many Pendau have made their living in metalsmithing, agriculture, hunting, fishing, and sago making.

Geographic distribution 
The Pendau often live in small, often isolated communities in Donggala between Balaesang and Dampal Utara. The Balaesang Peninsula forms its own mountain range that runs north and south, splitting the east and west coast. Most of the Pendau happen to live along the west coast. The  Sirenja sub-district is considered the southernmost boundary of the Pendau-speaking area.

Phonology

Vowels 
Pendau has no diphthongs.

W-glide formation 
The high back unrounded vowel changes to a labial-velar glide when it comes before a syllable with no consonant in the onset position. When this happens, the labial-velar glide takes the place of the onset consonant, reducing the number of would-be syllables.

Consonants 

Pendau has 19 consonant phonemes, although  (which is not an underlying phoneme) appears in its written orthography There are five contrastive places of articulation and six contrastive manners of articulation. There are two affricates in Pendau, the voiceless dental sibilant affricate and the voiced alveolar sibilant affricate.

Allophones 

In the above example,  in  behaves as a syllabic consonant.

In the table above, X means that the consonant can occupy the respective position in the syllable and + means that it is a marginal phoneme. In Pendau,  is the sole marginal phoneme, and it is hypothesized to be borrowed from Indonesian loan words.

Stress 
Stress always falls on the penultimate syllable and is unmarked. Words in Pendau require at least two syllables, which reflects this stress pattern. Some have described this process as "pitch accent" because the change in stress is accompanied by a change in pitch (as measured in Hz). However, Phil Quick, author of A Grammar of the Pendau Language, states that "the use of 'pitch accent' should not be confused with languages such as Japanese in which 'pitch accent' is a term used to indicate a lexical contrast similar to tone language ... So technically then there are two types of pitch-accent languages, those such as Japanese where pitch-accent is phonemic, and those such as Pendau where pitch-accent is non-phonemic."

Morphology 
Pendau uses affixation (including prefixes, infixes, and suffixes) and has seven verb classes which are categorized as transitive, intransitive, or mixed transitivity. Pendau shows extensive use of clitics, reduplication, and limited subject agreement.

Affixation

Verb classes 
Below is a table that lists all the verb classes in Pendau. All canonical verbs (besides stative verbs) require that the verb is prefixed with either the irrealis or realis mood. The subscripts A and P refers to whether the subject is the agent or patient.

Clitics
Pendau uses clitics show possession (genitive case), completion, continuation, relative clauses, and location. Clitics are phonologically part of the word (e.g., a word with a clitic adheres to the stress patterns as if the whole unit were one word), but syntactically functions as their own grammatical word.

Reduplication
Reduplication in Pendau is classified as either affixation or compounding. Both full and partial reduplication are present in Pendau. Reduplication is used for showing grammatical number, nominalization, and emphasis.

Agreement 
Subject agreement only occurs with two abilitative verbs (i.e., verbs that show the ability of doing the action):  'able'  and  'capable.' These verbs themselves are prefixed with either the irrealis or realis mood.

The examples below show  with first person subject agreement.

Syntax

Basic word order
The basic word order in Pendau is SVO or VOS, with the former being more common. Verbal prefixes show what the semantic role is of the argument in the subject position (agent or patient).

Inverse voice 
The inverse voice (VOS) can only be used with transitive verbs, and all transitive verbs can be inflected for the inverse voice. Intransitive verbs need to become transitive verbs through derivation before they can be in the inverse voice. Otherwise, the word order in Pendau (and the word order for all intransitive sentences) is SVO.

Prepositions 
Pendau is a prepositional language. Preposed markers can be both independent words and proclitics.

Preposition functioning as an independent word

Preposition (ri=) functioning as a proclitic

References

Bibliography 

Tomini–Tolitoli languages
Languages of Sulawesi